Gradačac Castle (Bosnian, Croatian and Serbian: Gradačačka tvrđava / Градачачка тврђава) is a castle in Gradačac in Bosnia and Herzegovina.

It is finished in the 19th century. In 1831 general captain Husein Gradaščević rallied the Bosnians against the Ottoman occupation and drove the Ottomans out of Bosnia to Kosovo, winning Bosnia its sovereignty for the coming year. Therefore, fortification has great historic importance for Bosnians. It has been recently renovated.

See also
Gradačac
List of castles in Bosnia and Herzegovina

References

Castles in Bosnia and Herzegovina
Rebuilt buildings and structures in Bosnia and Herzegovina
National Monuments of Bosnia and Herzegovina